Igor Anatolyevich Komarov (born May 25, 1964) is a Russian industrialist, financier and manager. He served as Plenipotentiary Representative of the President of the Russian Federation in the Volga Federal District from 18 September 2018 (acting from 7 September to 18 September). In March 2014, he was appointed the head of the United Rocket and Space Corporation (ORKK). Komarov served as Director General of the State Corporation for Space Activities "Roscosmos" between 21 January 2015 and 24 May 2018.

Biography 
Komarov was born in Engels, Saratov Oblast in 1986 and graduated from the Moscow State University. MV Lomonosov with a specialty "economist".

From 1992 to 2002, he worked in credit and financial institutions in executive positions (Inkombank, National Reserve Bank, Sberbank).

From 2002 to 2008, he was Deputy General Director of OJSC Mining and Metallurgical Company Norilsk Nickel for Economics and Finance.

Since October 2008, he held the position of Adviser to the General Director of the State Corporation "Rostekhnologii", in May 2009 was appointed Executive Vice President of JSC AVTOVAZ, and on August 28, 2009 - appointed President of this company.

On October 1, 2009, Igor Komarov was elected chairman of the Board of Directors of ZAO GM-AVTOVAZ.

October 16, 2013 Igor Komarov announced his resignation as president of JSC AVTOVAZ. Formally, his departure from the post of president of the car concern, he justified the transition to a new job, the president of the United Space Rocket Corporation.

During his time as President of AvtoVAZ, from 2009 to 2013, Igor Komarov and his team carried out reforms to radically reorganize the car factory.

October 23, 2013 by the order of the Chairman of the Government of the Russian Federation DA Medvedev was appointed deputy head of the Federal Space Agency (Roscosmos).

In March 2014, the government appointed the head of the United Rocket and Space Corporation.

On January 21, 2015, he headed the Roscosmos State Corporation.

On May 24, 2018, by the Decree of the President of the Russian Federation, the General Director of Roscosmos State Corporation was dismissed from office.

From July 11 to September 7, 2018 - Deputy Minister of Science and Higher Education of the Russian Federation.

References 

1964 births
Living people
1st class Active State Councillors of the Russian Federation
Moscow State University alumni
Russian industrialists
People from Engels, Saratov Oblast
Russian individuals subject to the U.S. Department of the Treasury sanctions